Bogorad is a Russian-language surname of Jewish origin, a Hebrew abbreviation for ''ben haRav Dovid", (בן הרב דוד), "son of rabbi David".  Notable people with the surname include:
F. A. Bogorad,  Russian neuropathologist, the namesake of Bogorad's syndrome
Lawrence Bogorad (1921-2003), American botanist
 Samuil Bogorad ru,  Jewish Hero of the Soviet Union

See also
Bogoraz, a surname of similar etymology

Russian-language surnames
Jewish surnames